This Is Satire is None More Black's second full-length album. It was released on Fat Wreck Chords in May 2006.

The title "We Dance on the Ruins of the Stupid Stage" is taken from a line in the film Mallrats.

Track listing
"We Dance on the Ruins of the Stupid Stage" – 3:32
"Under My Feet" – 2:24
"My Wallpaper Looks Like Paint" – 2:14
"Zing-Pong" – 2:52
"With the Transit Coat On" – 2:22
"Opinions & Assholes" – 1:47
"I See London" – 3:58
"Who Crosses State Lines Without a Shirt?" – 2:25
"D Is for Doorman (Come on In)" – 4:08
"10 Ton Jiggawatts" – 2:42
"You Suck! But Your Peanut Butter Is OK" – 1:40
"Yo, It's Not Rerun" – 2:10
"Majestic" – 3:45

References

2006 albums
None More Black albums
Fat Wreck Chords albums